This article contains information about the literary events and publications of 1955.

Events
February 8 – Jin Yong's first wuxia novel, The Book and the Sword (書劍恩仇錄), begins publication in the New Evening Post (Hong Kong), where he is an editor.
March 3 – Jean Cocteau is elected to the Académie française (inducted October 20); on January 8 he has been elected to the Académie royale des Sciences, des Lettres et des Beaux-Arts de Belgique (inducted October 1).
April 16 – Sir Laurence Olivier's film version of Shakespeare's Richard III is released in U.K. cinemas.
July 10 – Jorge Luis Borges is appointed Director of the National Library of the Argentine Republic.
July 14 – Director Stephen Joseph sets up Britain's first theatre in the round at Scarborough, North Yorkshire, predecessor of the Stephen Joseph Theatre.
July 30 – The English poet Philip Larkin, having become University Librarian at the University of Hull on March 21, is inspired on a train from Hull to Grantham to write a poem, "The Whitsun Weddings". His collection The Less Deceived is published in November (dated October).
August 
The American speculative fiction author Charles Beaumont's short story "The Crooked Man", depicting a homosexual society where heterosexuality is persecuted, is published in Playboy magazine after being rejected by Esquire.
An article in the British Journal of Education criticises Enid Blyton's novels as formulaic.
August 3 – The English-language première of Samuel Beckett's play Waiting for Godot, directed by Peter Hall, opens at the Arts Theatre, London. The initial reaction is hostile, but "[e]verything changed on Sunday 7 August 1955 with Kenneth Tynan's and Harold Hobson's reviews in The Observer and The Sunday Times. Beckett was always grateful to the two reviewers for their support ... which more or less transformed the play overnight into the rage of London."
August 27 – The first hardback edition of The Guinness Book of Records appears in London.
September – Vladimir Nabokov's Lolita appears in Paris three years before its US publication.
September 26 – The Madan Puraskar is established as an annual award for outstanding books in the Nepali language, endowed by Rani Jagadamba Kumari Devi (first awards 1956).
November – Frank Herbert's first novel The Dragon in the Sea begins as a three-part serial, Under Pressure, in the monthly Astounding Science-Fiction.
November 28 – Ray Lawler's Summer of the Seventeenth Doll is first staged by the Union Theatre Repertory Company in Melbourne with the playwright in a lead. It is the first authentically naturalistic drama in the theatre of Australia.
unknown date
Violette Leduc's novel Ravages is issued in France but the publisher, Éditions Gallimard, suppresses the opening section depicting a semi-autobiographical lesbian awakening, which will be published as a novella, Thérèse et Isabelle, in 1966.
The Indian guru Mani Madhava Chakyar performs Koodiyattam outside a temple for the first time.

New books

Fiction

Kingsley Amis – That Uncertain Feeling
Isaac Asimov
The End of Eternity
The Martian Way and Other Stories
Elisabeth Augustin – Labyrinth (Auswege)
Nigel Balchin – The Fall of the Sparrow
 Margot Bennett – The Man Who Didn't Fly
 John Bingham – The Paton Street Case
Antoine Blondin – L'Humeur vagabonde
Leigh Brackett – The Long Tomorrow
Ray Bradbury – The October Country
Christianna Brand – Tour de Force
Victor Canning – His Bones are Coral
Henry Cecil – Brothers in Law
Louis-Ferdinand Céline – Conversations with Professor Y (Entretiens avec le professeur Y)
Agatha Christie – Hickory Dickory Dock
Arthur C. Clarke – Earthlight
Ivy Compton-Burnett – Mother and Son
Thomas B. Costain – The Tontine
Marco Denevi – Rosaura a las 10 (Rosaura at 10 O'Clock)
Patrick Dennis – Auntie Mame
John Dickson Carr – Captain Cut-Throat
J. P. Donleavy – The Ginger Man
Friedrich Dürrenmatt – Once a Greek (Grieche sucht Griechin)
Mircea Eliade – The Forbidden Forest (Noaptea de Sânziene)
Ian Fleming – Moonraker
André Franquin – La Corne de rhinocéros
Gillian Freeman – The Liberty Man
William Gaddis – The Recognitions
Gao Yubao (with Guo Yongjiang) – Gao Yubao
David Garnett – Aspects of Love
William Golding – The Inheritors
Richard Gordon – Doctor at Large
Graham Greene
The Quiet American
Loser Takes All
Henri René Guieu
L'Agonie du Verre
Commandos de l'Espace
Univers parallèles
L.P. Hartley – A Perfect Woman
Robert A. Heinlein – Tunnel in the Sky
Georgette Heyer – Bath Tangle
Patricia Highsmith – The Talented Mr. Ripley
Robert E. Howard and L. Sprague de Camp – Tales of Conan
Aldous Huxley – The Genius and the Goddess
Mac Hyman – No Time for Sergeants
Roger Ikor – Les Eaux mêlées
Michael Innes – The Man from the Sea
Dan Jacobson – The Trap
Robin Jenkins – The Cone Gatherers
Ruth Prawer Jhabvala – To Whom She Will
MacKinlay Kantor – Andersonville
Nikos Kazantzakis – The Last Temptation of Christ (O Teleutaios Peirasmos)
Yaşar Kemal – Memed, My Hawk (İnce Memed)
Margaret Kennedy – The Oracles
Alexander Lernet-Holenia – Count Luna
E. C. R. Lorac – Ask a Policeman
Józef Mackiewicz
Droga donikąd (The Road to Nowhere)
Karierowicz
Alistair MacLean – HMS Ulysses
Norman Mailer – The Deer Park
Gabriel García Márquez
The Story of a Shipwrecked Sailor (Relato de un náufrago)
Leaf Storm (La Hojarasca)
Ngaio Marsh – Scales of Justice
J. J. Marric – Gideon's Day
Margaret Millar – Beast in View
Gladys Mitchell – Watson's Choice
Brian Moore – The Lonely Passion of Judith Hearne
Vladimir Nabokov – Lolita
Flannery O'Connor – A Good Man Is Hard to Find and Other Stories (including "A Good Man Is Hard to Find" and "Good Country People")
John O'Hara – Ten North Frederick
Pier Paolo Pasolini – Ragazzi di vita
Anthony Powell – The Acceptance World
Marin Preda – Moromeții, Vol. 1
Barbara Pym – Less than Angels
Alain Robbe-Grillet – Le Voyeur
Robert Ruark – Something of Value
Juan Rulfo – Pedro Páramo
Rafael Sánchez Ferlosio – El Jarama
A. S. T. Fisher (as Michael Scarrott) – Ambassador of Loss
Isaac Bashevis Singer – Satan in Goray
Howard Spring – These Lovers Fled Away
Mary Stewart – Madam, Will You Talk?
Rex Stout – Before Midnight
Jim Thompson – After Dark, My Sweet
Morton Thompson – Not as a Stranger
J. R. R. Tolkien – The Lord of the Rings: The Return of the King
Henry Wade –  A Dying Fall
Alec Waugh – Island in the Sun
Evelyn Waugh – Officers and Gentlemen
Anthony West – Heritage
Patrick White – The Tree of Man
Leonard Wibberley – The Mouse That Roared
Sloan Wilson – The Man in the Gray Flannel Suit
Herman Wouk – Marjorie Morningstar
John Wyndham – The Chrysalids
Frank Yerby – The Treasure of Pleasant Valley

Children and young people
Rev. W. Awdry – Four Little Engines (tenth in The Railway Series of 42 books by him and his son Christopher Awdry)
BB (Denys Watkins-Pitchford) – The Forest of Boland Light Railway
Paul Berna – Le Cheval sans tête (Horse without a Head, translated as A Hundred Million Francs)
Crockett Johnson – Harold and the Purple Crayon
C. S. Lewis – The Magician's Nephew
William Mayne – A Swarm in May
Janet McNeill – My Friend Specs McCann
Iona and Peter Opie – The Oxford Nursery Rhyme Book
Philippa Pearce – Minnow on the Say
Marjorie Kinnan Rawlings (died 1953) – The Secret River
Barbara Sleigh – Carbonel: The King of the Cats
E. C. Spykman – A Lemon and a Star
Catherine Storr – Clever Polly and the Stupid Wolf
Patricia Wrightson – The Crooked Snake
Eva-Lis Wuorio – Return of the Viking
Dick Bruna – Miffy

Drama
Arthur Adamov – Le Ping-Pong
Enid Bagnold – The Chalk Garden
Samuel Beckett – Waiting for Godot (English version)
Bertolt Brecht – Trumpets and Drums (Pauken und Trompeten; adaptation of Farquhar's The Recruiting Officer, 1706)
João Cabral de Melo Neto – Morte e Vida Severina (Severine Life and Death, verse)
Alice Childress – Trouble in Mind
 John Dighton – Man Alive!
Sonnie Hale – The French Mistress
William Inge – Bus Stop
Eugène Ionesco
Jack, or The Submission (Jacques ou la soumission)
The New Tenant (Le Nouveau locataire)
Ray Lawler – Summer of the Seventeenth Doll
Jerome Lawrence and Robert Edwin Lee – Inherit the Wind
Philip Mackie – The Whole Truth
Arthur Miller
A View from the Bridge (one-act verse version)
A Memory of Two Mondays
 J. B. Priestley  – Mr. Kettle and Mrs. Moon
Reginald Rose – Twelve Angry Men (stage version)
Jean-Paul Sartre – Nekrassov
Ariano Suassuna – O Auto da Compadecida (The Compassionate Self)
Orson Welles – Moby Dick—Rehearsed
Thornton Wilder
The Matchmaker
A Life in the Sun
Tennessee Williams – Cat on a Hot Tin Roof
Carl Zuckmayer – The Cold Light (Das kalte Licht)

Musical theater
 Cole Porter's musical Silk Stockings opens at Imperial Theatre New York City for 461 performances

Poetry

Philip Larkin – The Less Deceived
R.S. Thomas – Song at the Year's Turning

Non-fiction
Richard Aldington – Lawrence of Arabia: A Biographical Inquiry
James Baldwin – Notes of a Native Son
Frank Barlow – The Feudal Kingdom of England
Ivan Bunin (died 1953) – About Chekhov
G. D. H. Cole – Studies in Class Structure
Thomas E. Gaddis – Birdman of Alcatraz
Antonio Gramsci – Gli intellettuali e l'organizzazione della cultura (Intellectuals and Cultural Organization)
Robert Graves – The Greek Myths
The Guinness Book of Records, 1st edition
Langston Hughes – The Sweet Flypaper of Life
Morris K. Jessup – The Case for the UFO
R. K. Kelsall – Higher Civil Servants in Britain
T. E. Lawrence (352087 A/c Ross; died 1935) – The Mint: A day-book of the R.A.F. Depot between August and December 1922, with later notes (written 1928; 1st trade edition)
C. S. Lewis – Surprised by Joy
Walter Lippmann – Essays in the Public Philosophy
Walter Lord – A Night to Remember
Herbert Marcuse – Eros and Civilization
Alan Marshall – I Can Jump Puddles
Garrett Mattingly – Renaissance Diplomacy
Meher Baba – God Speaks
J. H. Plumb – Studies in Social History
RAND – A Million Random Digits with 100,000 Normal Deviates
Donald J. West – Homosexuality

Births
January 11 – Max Lucado, American religious writer
January 12 – Rockne S. O'Bannon, American writer and producer
January 13 – Jay McInerney, American novelist
January 27 – Alexander Stuart, English-born American novelist and screenwriter
February 2 – Leszek Engelking, Polish poet, fiction writer and translator
February 8 – John Grisham, American novelist
February 17 – Mo Yan, Chinese fiction writer
March 11 – D. J. MacHale, American writer
March 19 – John Burnside, Scottish poet and fiction writer
March 23 – Lloyd Jones, New Zealand novelist
March 27 – Patrick McCabe, Irish novelist
April 8 – Barbara Kingsolver, American novelist, essayist and poet
April 30 – Zlatko Topčić, Bosnian author and screenwriter
May 13 – Mark Abley, Canadian poet and non-fiction writer
May 30 – Colm Tóibín, Irish novelist, playwright and poet
June 4 – Val McDermid, Scottish crime novelist
June 16 – J. Jill Robinson, Canadian fiction writer
June 20 – Tor Nørretranders, Danish science author
July 1
Candia McWilliam, Scottish fiction writer
Lisa Scottoline, American writer of legal thrillers
July 5
Sebastian Barry, Irish novelist, playwright and poet
Mia Couto (António Emílio Leite Couto), Mozambican fiction writer and poet
July 6
Michael Boyd, British theatre director
William Wall, Irish author and poet
July 7 – Suzanne Weyn, American children's and young-adult writer
July 10 – Regina Yaou, Ivory Coast novelist (died 2017)
July 12 – Robin Robertson, Scottish-born poet, novelist and editor
July 24 – Brad Watson, American author and academic (died 2020)
August 2 – Caleb Carr, American writer
August 7 – Vladimir Sorokin, Russian writer
August 8 – Iain Pears, English writer
August 14 - Mary E. Pearson, American young-adult fiction writer
September 6 – Raymond Benson, American novelist
September 13 – Hiromi Itō (伊藤 比呂美), Japanese poet, essayist and translator
October 19 – Jason Shinder, American poet and editor (died 2008)
November 12 – Katharine Weber, American author and academic
November 23 – Steven Brust, American fantasy author
December 28 – Liu Xiaobo (刘晓波), Chinese critic, writer and activist (died 2017)
unknown date – Wang Xiaoni (王小妮), Chinese poet

Deaths
January 20 – Robert P. Tristram Coffin, American poet, essayist and novelist (born 1892)
February 23 – Paul Claudel, French poet, dramatist and diplomat (born 1868)
April 10 – Pierre Teilhard de Chardin, French philosopher and essayist (born 1881)
May 16 – James Agee, American writer (born 1909)
June 6 – Joseph Jefferson Farjeon, English crime writer (born 1883)
June 17 – Constance Holme, English novelist and dramatist (born 1880)
June 19 – Adrienne Monnier, French poet and publisher (born 1892)
June 21 – Roger Mais, Jamaican novelist (born 1905)
June 30 – Gilbert Cannan, British writer (born 1884)
July 3 – Beatrice Chase, English writer (born 1874)
August 1 – Charles Shaw, Australian writer (born 1900)
August 2 – Wallace Stevens, American poet (born 1879)
August 12 – Thomas Mann, German novelist (born 1875)
August 14 – Herbert Putnam, American Librarian of Congress (born 1861)
August 29 – Hong Shen (洪深), Chinese dramatist (born 1894)
September 7 – Mary Tracy Earle , American author and essayist (born 1864)
September 20 – Robert Riskin, American dramatist and screenwriter (born 1897)
October 18 – José Ortega y Gasset, Spanish philosopher (born 1883)
November 1 – Dale Carnegie, American writer (born 1888)
November 12 – Tin Ujević, Croatian poet (born 1891)
November 14
Ruby M. Ayres, English romance novelist (born 1881)
Robert E. Sherwood, American playwright (born 1896)
December – Al. T. Stamatiad, Romanian poet (born 1885)

Awards
Carnegie Medal for children's literature: Eleanor Farjeon, The Little Bookroom
Frost Medal: Leona Speyer
James Tait Black Memorial Prize for fiction: Ivy Compton-Burnett, Mother and Son
James Tait Black Memorial Prize for biography: R. W. Ketton-Cremer, Thomas Gray
Newbery Medal for children's literature: Meindert DeJong, The Wheel on the School
Nobel Prize for Literature: Halldór Kiljan Laxness
Premio Nadal: Rafael Sánchez Ferlosio, El Jarama
Prix Goncourt: Roger Ikor, Les eaux mêlées<ref"></ref>
Pulitzer Prize for Drama: Tennessee Williams, Cat on a Hot Tin Roof
Pulitzer Prize for Fiction: William Faulkner, A Fable
Pulitzer Prize for Poetry: Wallace Stevens, Collected Poems
Queen's Gold Medal for Poetry: Ruth Pitter

References

 
Years of the 20th century in literature